Dimitris Froxylias (born 28 June 1993) is a Cypriot professional footballer who plays as an attacking midfielder for Omonoia 29th May.

Club career
Born in Larissa, Greece, Froxylias began his early career in 2005, aged 12, at Toxotis Larissa's youth team. He continued in APOEL and in July 2007, he moved to AEK Athens youth academy after Toni Savevski's recommendation.

In October 2009, he was selected by coach Dušan Bajević to begin training with AEK's first squad. In January 2010, at the age of sixteen, he signed a three-year contract with AEK. Froxylias made his first appearance for the club, as a substitute for Panagiotis Lagos, during a UEFA Europa League match with R.S.C. Anderlecht on 4 November 2010, becoming the youngest player ever to wear the club's shirt in a European club football match, at the age of seventeen.

He signed a deal until January with Scottish Championship side Dumbarton on deadline day, 2017, scoring an extra-time free-kick winner on his debut against Connah's Quay Nomads. He followed that up by scoring another late winner on his home league debut, this time against Brechin City on 16 September 2017. After a series of impressive performances, he agreed a deal until the summer of 2018 with the club in October 2017.

Froxylias scored a stunning late free-kick winner for the Sons against Welsh Champions The New Saints - a goal that sent Dumbarton into a national cup final for the first time in over 100 years. He left the club at the end of his contract in May 2018 and signed for Scottish Championship club Falkirk. After just eight appearances he left the club in October 2018. After a spell out of the game Froxylias joined English Isthmian League side Haringey Borough, joining up with international teammate Georgios Aresti.

International career
Froxylias was called up to the Cyprus national football team for the first time in March 2018 for their friendly against Montenegro, becoming the first Dumbarton player since Harry Chatton in 1932 to receive full international honours.

Personal life
Froxylias holds passports from both Greece and Cyprus, since his mother originates from Cypriot village Agios Epifanios. He decided to join the Cypriot national team.

Career statistics

References

Living people
1993 births
Footballers from Larissa
Cypriot footballers
Cyprus international footballers
Cyprus youth international footballers
Greek footballers
Greek people of Cypriot descent
Association football forwards
Cypriot First Division players
Super League Greece 2 players
AEK Athens F.C. players
Apollon Limassol FC players
Ethnikos Achna FC players
AEK Larnaca FC players
Enosis Neon Paralimni FC players
Nea Salamis Famagusta FC players
Ermis Aradippou FC players
Cypriot expatriate sportspeople in Scotland
Dumbarton F.C. players
Scottish Professional Football League players
Expatriate footballers in Scotland
Cypriot expatriate footballers
Falkirk F.C. players
Panachaiki F.C. players
Onisilos Sotira players
Expatriate footballers in England
Cypriot expatriate sportspeople in England